Vishnu Vijay  is an Indian music composer and a prolific flautist who works predominantly in Malayalam cinema. His film music career began with the 2016 Malayalam film Guppy. His other works include Ambili (2019) and Thallumaala (2022).

Early life
Vijay has attended Government Model Boys Higher Secondary School, Thiruvananthapuram for schooling then bachelor of performing arts degree and is a vocal music graduate from Swathi Thirunal College of Music, Thiruvananthapuram. He has received musical training from Kudamaloor Janardanan.

Career
Vishnu has worked with composers Devi Sri Prasad in Tamil and Telugu and also with G. V. Prakash Kumar and Vijay Antony in Tamil, prior to making it into the Malayalam industry. In Malayalam he has associated with Ouseppachan, Gopi Sunder, Vidyasagar and Deepak Dev.

Scoring and soundtracks
Vijay debuted as an independent music composer through the 2016 Malayalam movie Guppy.

Awards
47th Kerala State Film Awards 
Best Background Music – Guppy
Other Awards
 Yuva Sangeetha Prathibha Puraskaram

Discography

References

1989 births
Living people
Malayalam film score composers
Indian flautists
Indian record producers
Indian male film score composers